Stanko Tavčar (2 February 1898 in Dobrova, Austro-Hungary – 11 July 1945 in Ljubljana, Yugoslavia) was a Yugoslav footballer and later a medical doctor.

He was the first Slovenian footballer that played in the Yugoslav national team.

He was born in Dobrova, near Ljubljana, and spend his entire football career, from 1912 until 1922, playing as defender in ŠK Ilirija Ljubljana winning with them 3 Slovenian football championships. Playing as a full-back, light and with short stature, his main qualities were his great speed and technique making him one of the rare defenders of that period that were able to participate in offensive actions, as well.

He played two matches for Yugoslav national team, both at the 1920 Summer Olympics tournament.

He studied Medicine at Charles University in Prague and after retiring from football, he practiced medicine in Ljubljana, Kranj and Vienna.

References

1898 births
1945 deaths
Footballers from Ljubljana
Yugoslav physicians
Charles University alumni
Slovenian footballers
Yugoslav footballers
Yugoslavia international footballers
Olympic footballers of Yugoslavia
Footballers at the 1920 Summer Olympics
ND Ilirija 1911 players
Association football defenders
People from the Municipality of Dobrova-Polhov Gradec
People from Ljubljana in health professions